Quartier V.I.P. is a 2005 French comedy film directed by Laurent Firode.

Plot 
Guardian of Health, Alex leads a quiet life with his wife Louisette and his colleague and friend René. Transferred to the district "VIP", he was offered by one of the detainees, Bertrand, a businessman convicted of fraudulent business, a strange deal: Claire, Bertrand's wife who decided to separate a husband become cumbersome while enjoying his fortune, Alex will be responsible to approach it.

Alex will offer him a tempting but phony financial deal that enables Bertrand to get his money. Eager to put a little spice in his life, Alex agrees to play the game and behave during his evenings and discreet Swiss businessman! Claire is seduced and even more: she falls in love.

Bertrand quickly realizes that Alex is really interested in his wife, Claire discovers the deception and financial Louisette spousal betrayal. But Bertrand shows good sport, Louisette consoles himself with René. Claire, tired of artificial life, a new life with Alex ...

Cast 
 Johnny Hallyday as Alex
 Pascal Légitimus as René
 Valeria Bruni Tedeschi as Claire
 François Berléand as Bertrand Fussac
 Catherine Jacob as Louisette
 Jean-Claude Brialy as Ferdinand
 Bruno Lochet as Michaud
 Philippe Duquesne as Prison's director
 Jacky Nercessian as Émile
 Bernard Blancan as A Prisoner
 Eric Savin as Tony
 Lysiane Meis as Joyce
 Husky Kihal as Michel
 Michaël Moyon as Toufik
 Thierry Desroses as Dieuleveut
 Frédéric Bouraly as The waiter

References

External links 

2005 films
2005 comedy films
French comedy films
Films directed by Laurent Firode
2000s French films
2000s French-language films